San Miguel de Foces is a church located 2 km from Ibieca, central Spain.

See also
Catholic Church in Spain

References

Miguel de Foces